The Mary Tyler Moore Show (also known simply as Mary Tyler Moore) is an American sitcom television series created by James L. Brooks and Allan Burns and starring actress Mary Tyler Moore. The show originally aired on CBS from 1970 to 1977. Moore portrayed Mary Richards, an unmarried, independent woman focused on her career as associate producer of a news show at the fictional local station WJM in Minneapolis. Ed Asner co-starred as Mary's boss Lou Grant, alongside Gavin MacLeod, Ted Knight, Georgia Engel, and Betty White, with Valerie Harper as friend and neighbor Rhoda Morgenstern, and Cloris Leachman as friend and landlady Phyllis Lindstrom.

The Mary Tyler Moore Show proved to be a groundbreaking series in the era of second-wave feminism; portraying a central female character who was neither married nor dependent on a man was a rarity on American television in the 1970s.  The show has been celebrated for its complex, relatable characters and story lines. The Mary Tyler Moore Show received consistent praise from critics and high ratings during its original run and earned 29 Primetime Emmy Awards, including Outstanding Comedy Series three years in a row (1975–1977). Moore received the Primetime Emmy Award for Outstanding Lead Actress in a Comedy Series three times. The series also launched three spin-offs: Rhoda, Phyllis, and Lou Grant. In 2013, the Writers Guild of America ranked The Mary Tyler Moore Show No. 6 on its list of the "101 Best Written TV Series of All Time".

Seasons

Premise
Mary Richards (Moore) is a single woman who, at age 30, moves to Minneapolis on the heels of a broken engagement. She applies for a secretarial job at fictional television station WJM, but the position is already taken. She is instead offered the post of associate producer of the station's six o'clock news. She befriends tough but lovable boss Lou Grant (Ed Asner), newswriter Murray Slaughter (Gavin MacLeod), and buffoonish anchorman Ted Baxter (Ted Knight). Mary is later promoted to producer of the show, though her duties remain the same.

Mary rents a third-floor studio apartment in a 19th-century house from acquaintance Phyllis Lindstrom (Cloris Leachman); Mary and upstairs neighbor Rhoda Morgenstern (Valerie Harper) become best friends. Characters introduced later in the series include the acerbic, man-hungry hostess of WJM's Happy Homemaker show, Sue Ann Nivens (Betty White), and soft-voiced, sweet-natured Georgette Franklin (Georgia Engel), as Ted Baxter's girlfriend (and eventual wife). At the beginning of season 6, after both Rhoda and Phyllis move away (providing a premise for two spinoffs), Mary relocates to a one-bedroom apartment in a high-rise building; Minneapolis's Riverside Plaza was used for establishing shots.

From the beginning, issues such as workplace discrimination against women figured into episode stories. In the third season, issues such as equal pay for women, pre-marital sex, and homosexuality are woven into the show's comedic plots. In season four, marital infidelity and divorce are explored with Phyllis and Lou, respectively. In the fifth season, Mary refuses to reveal a news source and is jailed for contempt of court. While in jail, she befriends a prostitute (Barbara Colby) who seeks Mary's help in a subsequent episode. In the highly rated sixth-season episode "The Seminar", Betty Ford makes history by becoming the first First Lady to appear on a television sitcom in a cameo role. The show's final seasons explore death in "Chuckles Bites the Dust" and juvenile offenders in "Mary's Delinquent"; Ted suffers a heart attack; Ted and Georgette contend with intimate marital problems, deal with infertility, and adopt a child; and Mary overcomes an addiction to sleeping pills. Mary dates many men on and off over the years but remains single throughout the series.

One of the show's running gags is Mary's inability to throw a successful, problem-free party. Various disasters throughout the seasons include the break-up of two of Mary's closest friends; an insufficient amount of food due to unexpected guests; a power failure while attendees await the arrival of a high-profile guest of honor (Johnny Carson); and the birth of Ted and Georgette's baby.

Characters 

 Mary Richards (Mary Tyler Moore), a single native Minnesotan, moves to Minneapolis in 1970 at age 30 and becomes associate producer of WJM-TV's Six O'Clock News. Her sincere, kind demeanor often acts as a foil for the personalities of her co-workers and friends.
 Lou Grant (Edward Asner) is producer (later executive producer) of the news. His tough and grumpy demeanor initially hides his kind-hearted nature which is gradually revealed as the series progresses. He is referred to as "Lou" by everyone, including Mary's friends, with the exception of Mary herself, who can rarely bring herself to call him anything other than "Mr. Grant". He is married to Edie (Priscilla Morrill), but during the run of the show they separate and divorce.
 Murray Slaughter (Gavin MacLeod), head writer, makes frequent quips about Ted Baxter's mangling of his news copy and Sue Ann Nivens' aggressive, man-hungry attitude. He is Mary's closest coworker and close friend. Murray is married to the occasionally seen Marie (Joyce Bulifant) and has several children.
 Ted Baxter (Ted Knight) is the dim-witted, vain, and miserly anchorman of the Six O'Clock News. He frequently makes mistakes and is oblivious to the actual nature of the topics covered on the show but, to cover for tormenting insecurity, he postures as the country's best news journalist. He is often criticized by others, especially Murray and Lou, for his many shortcomings, but is never fired from his position. Initially a comic buffoon in the series, Ted's better nature is gradually revealed as the series unfolds, helped along by his sweet, seemingly vague, but frequently perceptive wife Georgette.
 Rhoda Morgenstern (Valerie Harper) (1970–1974, 1975, 1977) (Regular, seasons 1–4; Guest, seasons 6–7) is Mary's upstairs neighbor and best friend. She works as a window dresser, first at the fictional Bloomfield's Department Store and later at Hempel's Department Store. Though insecure about her appearance, she is also outgoing and sardonic, making frequent wisecracks, often at her own expense. Like Mary, she is single. She dates frequently, routinely joking about her disastrous dates. Rhoda moves to New York City and falls in love after the fourth season, beginning the spinoff series Rhoda.
 Phyllis Lindstrom (Cloris Leachman) (1970–1975) (Season 1–5, 7 Guest) is Mary's snobbish friend and neighbor. Phyllis is a recurring character appearing in many episodes of the first two seasons, after which her appearances decline in frequency. She is married to unseen character Lars, a dermatologist, and has a precocious daughter, Bess (Lisa Gerritsen). Phyllis is controlling, egotistical and often arrogant. She is actively involved in groups and clubs and is a political activist and a supporter of Women's Liberation. Rhoda and Phyllis are usually at odds and often trade insults. After appearing in three episodes of season five, Phyllis moves to the spin-off show Phyllis. In that series, it is explained Phyllis has been widowed. Discovering that her husband had virtually no assets and that she must support herself, Phyllis returns to her home town of San Francisco.
 Georgette Franklin Baxter (Georgia Engel) (1972–77) (Season 3–7) is the somewhat ditzy girlfriend of stentorian news anchor Ted Baxter. Mary Tyler Moore described her as a cross between Stan Laurel and Marilyn Monroe. She and Mary get along fantastically, and Georgette helps fill the void created by the departure of Rhoda and Phyllis. Georgette, a co-worker of Rhoda's at Hempel's Department Store, is introduced as a guest at one of Mary's parties. Later, she works for a car rental service, as a Golden Girl, and for Rhoda selling plants. Georgette is devoted to Ted and they eventually marry in Mary's apartment. They adopt a child named David (Robbie Rist), and later, Georgette gives birth in Mary's apartment to a girl who is (temporarily) named Mary Lou.
 Sue Ann Nivens (Betty White) (1973–1977) (Season 4–7), host of WJM's The Happy Homemaker show. While her demeanor is superficially cheerful, she makes judgmental comments about Mary, exchanges personal insults with Murray, and uses many sexual double entendres, especially around Lou, to whom she is strongly attracted.

Production 

When Moore was first approached about the show, she "was unsure and unwilling to commit, fearing any new role might suffer in comparison with her Laura Petrie character in The Dick Van Dyke Show, which also aired on CBS, and was already cemented as one of the most popular parts in TV history". Moore's character was initially intended to be a divorcée, but divorce was still controversial at the time. In addition, CBS was afraid viewers might think that Mary had divorced Rob Petrie, Laura's husband on The Dick Van Dyke Show, so the premise was changed to that of a single woman with a recently broken engagement. Notably, Van Dyke never guest starred in any episode, although his brother Jerry Van Dyke guest-starred in a couple of episodes during the third and fourth seasons. (Jerry had also regularly appeared on The Dick Van Dyke Show.)

According to co-creator Allan Burns, Minnesota was selected for the show's location after "one of the writers began talking about the strengths and weaknesses of the Vikings". A television newsroom was chosen for the show's workplace because of the supporting characters often found there, stated co-creator James Brooks. Aside from establishing shots and the title sequence, the show was filmed at the CBS Studio Center in Los Angeles.

Kenwood Parkway house

In 1995, Entertainment Weekly said that "TV's most famous bachelorette pad" was Mary's apartment. The fictitious address was 119 North Weatherly, but the exterior establishing shots were of a real house in Minneapolis at 2104 Kenwood Parkway. In the real house, an unfinished attic occupied the space behind the window recreated on the interior studio set of Mary's apartment.

Once fans of the series discovered where exterior shots had been taken, the house became a popular tourist destination. According to Moore, the woman who lived in the house was "overwhelmed" by people showing up and "asking if Mary was around". To discourage crews from filming additional footage of the house, the owners placed an "Impeach Nixon" sign beneath the window where Mary supposedly lived. The house continued to attract multiple tour buses a day more than a decade after production ended.

In January 2017, the house was marketed for a price of $1.7 million.

Title sequences 

The opening title sequence features many scenes filmed on location in Minneapolis in both summer and winter, as well as a few clips from the show's studio scenes. The sequence changed each season, but always ended with Mary tossing her hat into the air in front of what was then the flagship Donaldson's department store at the intersection of South 7th Street and Nicollet Mall in downtown Minneapolis. The hat toss was ranked by Entertainment Weekly as the second greatest moment in television. On May 8, 2002, Moore was in attendance when basic cable network TV Land dedicated a statue to her that captured her iconic throw. In 2010, TV Guide ranked the show's opening title sequence No. 3 on a list of TV's Top Ten credit sequences, as selected by readers. In 2017, James Charisma of Paste ranked the show's opening sequence No. 15 on a list of The 75 Best TV Title Sequences of All Time.

Sonny Curtis wrote and performed the opening theme song, "Love Is All Around". The lyrics changed between the first and second seasons, in part to reflect Mary Richards having become settled in her new home. The later lyrics, which accompanied many more episodes at a time when the show's popularity was at a peak, are more widely known, and most covers of the song use these words. For season 7, there was a slightly new musical arrangement for the opening theme, but the lyrics remained the same as seasons 2–6.

No supporting cast members are credited during the show's opening (though from the second season on, shots of them appear). The ending sequences show snippets of the cast, as well as any major guest stars in that episode, with the respective actors' names at the bottom of the screen. Other on-location scenes are also shown during the closing credits, including a rear shot of Mary holding hands with her date, played by Moore's then-husband, Grant Tinker, and Moore and Valerie Harper feeding ducks on the bank of a pond in a Minneapolis park (this shot remained in the credits, even after Harper left the show). Many of the opening shots were filmed at Lake of the Isles. The ending sequence music is an instrumental version of "Love is All Around". The ending finishes with Mimsie the cat meowing within the MTM company logo.

Cultural impact 
In 2007 Time put The Mary Tyler Moore Show on its list of "17 Shows That Changed TV". Time stated that the series "liberated TV for adults—of both sexes" by being "a sophisticated show about grownups among other grownups, having grownup conversations". The Associated Press said that the show "took 20 years of pointless, insipid situation comedy and spun it on its heels. [It did this by] pioneer[ing] reality comedy and the establishment of clearly defined and motivated secondary characters."

Tina Fey, creator and lead actress of the 2006-debut sitcom 30 Rock, explained that Moore's show helped inspire 30 Rocks emphasis on office relationships. "Our goal is to try to be like The Mary Tyler Moore Show, where it's not about doing the news", said Fey. Entertainment Weekly also noted that the main characters of 30 Rock mirror those of The Mary Tyler Moore Show.

When the writers of the sitcom Friends were about to create their series finale, they watched several other sitcom finales. Co-creator Marta Kauffman said that the last episode of The Mary Tyler Moore Show was the "gold standard" and that it influenced the finale of Friends.

Spin-offs, specials and reunions 

The show spun off three television series, all of which aired on CBS: the sitcoms Rhoda (1974–78) and Phyllis (1975–77), and the one-hour drama Lou Grant (1977–82). In 2000, Moore and Harper reprised their roles in a two-hour ABC TV-movie, Mary and Rhoda.

Two retrospective specials were produced by CBS: Mary Tyler Moore: The 20th Anniversary Show (1991) and The Mary Tyler Moore Reunion (2002). On May 19, 2008, the surviving cast members of The Mary Tyler Moore Show reunited on The Oprah Winfrey Show to reminisce about the series. Winfrey, a longtime admirer of Moore and the show, had her staff recreate the sets of the WJM-TV newsroom and Mary's apartment (seasons 1–5) for the reunion.

In 2013, the women of The Mary Tyler Moore Show – Cloris Leachman, Valerie Harper, Mary Tyler Moore, Betty White, and Georgia Engel  – reunited on the TV Land sitcom Hot in Cleveland, which aired on September 4. Katie Couric interviewed the cast on Katie as they celebrated acting together for the first time in more than 30 years. It would be their final time on-screen together, as Mary Tyler Moore died in January 2017.

In popular culture 
The show has remained popular since the final episode was broadcast in 1977. Several songs, films and other television programs reference or parody characters and events from the show, including the memorable "can turn the world on with her smile" line from the title song. Parodies were done on shows such as Saturday Night Live, MadTV, and Mystery Science Theater 3000 (which was produced in Minneapolis). Musical artist Barbara Kessler and groups The Hold Steady and Relient K have all referred to the show in their songs.

The show has also been mentioned in film. In the Will Ferrell comedy film Anchorman: The Legend of Ron Burgundy, the name of Burgundy's dog, Baxter, refers to the character Ted Baxter, and the head of the newsroom staff is named Ed, honoring Ed Asner. In the 1997 film Romy & Michele's High School Reunion, the characters argue with each other while exclaiming "I'm the Mary and you're the Rhoda." Frank DeCaro of The New York Times wrote that this was the highlight of the film.

The show's Emmy-winning final episode has been alluded to many times in other series' closing episodes, such as the 1988 finale of St. Elsewhere (including the group shuffle to the tissue box).

Broadcast history

United States
For most of its broadcasting run, the program was the lead-in for The Bob Newhart Show, which was also produced by MTM Enterprises.

Syndication
The show did not do well initially in syndication, never being shown in more than 25 percent of the United States at a time, according to Robert S. Alley, the co-author of a book about the series. In the fall of 1992, Nick at Nite began broadcasting the series nightly, launching it with a week-long "Mary-thon", and it became the network's top-rated series.

It is available on Hulu. It was a longtime staple of Weigel Broadcasting's MeTV network dating back to its 2003 launch in Chicago, expanding nationwide in 2011, but has since moved to Decades, another Weigel-owned network (although ViacomCBS has a partial stake in the network).

United Kingdom
The series was broadcast on BBC1 from February 13, 1971, to December 29, 1972. The BBC broadcast the first 34 episodes before the series was dropped. Beginning in 1975, a number of ITV companies picked up the series. Channel 4 repeated the first 39 episodes between January 30, 1984, and August 23, 1985. The full series was repeated on The Family Channel from 1993 to 1996.

Home media 
The entire series was released on DVD in Region 1 between 2002 and 2010. Originally, season 1 was housed in a multi-panel fold-out digipak in a slipcase, while seasons 2-4 were issued in a slipcase, with each disc being housed in its own slim case. Starting with season 5, each season was issued in a standard 3-disc DVD keepcase, and seasons 1-4 were reissued in the same style of DVD packaging. The discs from each of these releases were repackaged in 2018 as a complete series set.

On the season 7 DVD, the last episode's "final curtain call", broadcast only once on March 19, 1977 (March 18 in Canada), was included at the request of fans. However, some of the season 7 sets did not include the curtain call; a replacement disc is reported to be available from the manufacturer.

Awards and honors

Emmys 
In addition to numerous nominations, The Mary Tyler Moore Show won 29 Emmy Awards. This was a record unbroken until Frasier earned its 30th in 2002.

Honors 
 The show was honored with a Peabody Award in 1977. In presenting the award, the Peabody committee stated that MTM Enterprises had "established the benchmark by which all situation comedies must be judged" and lauded the show "for a consistent standard of excellence – and for a sympathetic portrayal of a career woman in today's changing society".
 The 1987 book Classic Sitcoms, by Vince Waldron, contains a poll among TV critics of the top sitcoms of all time up to that date. Mary Tyler Moore was the No. 1 show on that list.
 In 1997 TV Guide ranked "Chuckles Bites The Dust" No. 1 on its list of The 100 Greatest Episodes of All Time. "The Lars Affair" made the list at No. 27.
 In 1998 Entertainment Weekly placed The Mary Tyler Moore Show first in its list of the 100 Greatest TV Shows of all Time.
 In 1999 the TV Guide list of the 50 Greatest TV Characters of All Time ranked Mary Richards 21st and Ted Baxter 29th. Only three other shows placed two characters on the list (Taxi, The Honeymooners and Seinfeld).
 In 1999 Entertainment Weekly ranked the opening credits image of Mary tossing her hat into the air as No. 2 on its list of The 100 Greatest Moments In Television.
 In 2002, The Mary Tyler Moore Show was 11th on TV Guide's 50 Greatest TV Shows of All Time.
 In 2003, USA Today called it "one of the best shows ever to air on TV".
 In 2006, Entertainment Weekly ranked Rhoda 23rd on its list of the best sidekicks ever.
 In 2007, Time placed the Mary Tyler Moore Show on its unranked list of "100 Best TV Shows of All-TIME".
 Bravo ranked Mary Richards 8th, Lou Grant 35th, Ted Baxter 48th, and Rhoda Morgenstern 57th on its list of the 100 greatest TV characters.
 In 2013, the Writers Guild of America ranked The Mary Tyler Moore Show as the sixth best written TV series ever.
 Also in 2013, Entertainment Weekly ranked The Mary Tyler Moore Show as the fourth best TV series ever.
 In a third 2013 list, TV Guide ranked The Mary Tyler Moore Show as the seventh greatest show of all time.
 In 2022, Rolling Stone ranked The Mary Tyler Moore Show number ten on its list of the 100 greatest TV shows.

References

Further reading 
 
Cynthia Littleton, (1 Jan 2022). ‘The Mary Tyler Moore Show’ Deaths in 2021 Reflect Passage of Time for Network TV. (Variety).

External links 

 The Mary Tyler Moore Show at the Encyclopedia of Television
 
 Citysearch: The Mary Tyler Moore Show Tour describing locations featured in the series
 The Mary & Rhoda Magazine, with a brief selection of articles about the series
 

 
1970s American sitcoms
1970 American television series debuts
1970s American workplace comedy television series
1977 American television series endings
CBS original programming
English-language television shows
Minnesota in fiction
Peabody Award-winning television programs
Primetime Emmy Award for Outstanding Comedy Series winners
Television news sitcoms
Television series about television
Television series by MTM Enterprises
Television series created by Allan Burns
Television series created by James L. Brooks
Television shows set in Minnesota